Roland Jentsch is a former German curler.

He is a former European men's curling champion (1991) and two-time German men's curling champion (1989, 1998; silver in 1988; bronze in 1991, 1996).

His two daughters Daniela Jentsch and Analena Jentsch are well-known German curlers too.

Teams

Men's

Mixed

References

External links
 
 

Living people
German male curlers
European curling champions
German curling champions

Year of birth missing (living people)